Joseph Edward Mullen (March 9, 1913 – January 10, 1988) was an American professional basketball player. He played in the National Basketball League for the Oshkosh All-Stars and averaged 1.9 points per game. He also coached the Milwaukee Shooting Stars, an independent team, for the 1946–47 season.

After his professional basketball career, Mullen became an attorney, practiced law in Washington, D.C. for a number of years, and eventually moved to San Francisco, California to work for the United States Department of Veterans Affairs. He died from an aneurysm.

References

1913 births
1988 deaths
20th-century American lawyers
All-American college men's basketball players
American men's basketball coaches
American men's basketball players
Basketball coaches from California
Basketball coaches from Washington, D.C.
Basketball coaches from Wisconsin
Basketball players from San Francisco
Basketball players from Washington, D.C.
Basketball players from Wisconsin
Guards (basketball)
Lawyers from San Francisco
Lawyers from Washington, D.C.
Marquette Golden Eagles men's basketball players
Oshkosh All-Stars players
Sportspeople from Fond du Lac, Wisconsin